In mathematics probability theory, a basic affine jump diffusion (basic AJD) is a stochastic process Z of the form

A basic AJD is a special case of an affine process and of a jump diffusion. On the other hand, the Cox–Ingersoll–Ross (CIR) process is a special case of a basic AJD.

Basic AJDs are attractive for modeling default times in credit risk applications, since both the moment generating function

and the characteristic function

are known in closed form.

The characteristic function allows one to calculate the density of an integrated basic AJD

by Fourier inversion, which can be done efficiently using the FFT.

References

Stochastic processes